Dimitrios Limnios (born 27 May 1998) is a Greek professional footballer who plays as a winger for Bundesliga side 1. FC Köln, and the Greece national team.

Club career

Early career
Born in Volos in 1998, Limnios started his football career with Niki Volos. In 2012, Limnios moved to the Atromitos youth team.

Atromitos
In 2014, Limnios was called up to the Atromitos first team. At the age of 16, on 16 October 2014, he made his Superleague Greece debut against Ergotelis at Peristeri Stadium, replacing Andreas Tatos at the 84th minute. He is the third-youngest player to have appeared in the Greek Super League (after Kyriakos Papadopoulos and Kostas Antoniou) and he made his European debut this season against AIK in the Europa League second qualifying round. He is not dissimilar to Kostas Mitroglou in playing style – often swatting aside defenders with his powerful runs. On 4 December 2016, Limnios scored his first goal with the club in a triumphic 2–1 away win against AEL in the Super League Greece. The goal came one minute into first half injury time, and was assisted by Anthony Le Tallec.

On 6 April 2017, Atromitos accepted an offer from PAOK for the signing of the 18-year-old international winger. PAOK have been in negotiations with Atromitos for the 18-year-old youngster who has impressed with his performances since the start of the 2016–17 season. The two clubs reached an agreement in the region of €900,000 (with a 15% future resale rate) and Limnios will join PAOK in the summer transfer window. Limnios is described as one of the best prospects in Greek football and PAOK moved quickly to secure his services.

PAOK
On 20 August 2017, Limnios made his debut with the club in a 0–0 away game against Levadiakos. He was replaced by Diego Biseswar in the 62nd minute. On 29 November 2017, he scored his first goal with the club in a 5–0 away Greek Cup win against Aiginiakos.
On 8 August 2018, Limnios scored when Léo Matos from the right turned the ball to the penalty shootout and Limnios screamed for the equaliser, in a 3–2 home win game for UEFA Champions League Third qualifying round, 1st leg against Spartak Moskva.
On 29 October 2018, Limnios barely 30 seconds after coming on to replace Biseswar, slide from close range after an assist from Léo Jabá to finish a slick move down the left flank, in a 2–0 home win game against rivals Panathinaikos.

Despite Limnios' goal in PAOK's 2019–20 Europa League play-off second leg that helped give his side a 3–2 win on the night, opponents Slovan Bratislava progressed on away goals after the scores finished 3–3 on aggregate. On 20 October 2019, Limnios nodded a header past Markos Vellidis, who found himself in a poor position again, from a Dimitris Giannoulis' cross, in a hammering 3–0 home win game against Lamia. A week later, he scored with a header in a 2–0 away win against Volos after Giannoulis' assist. On 15 December 2019, he scored after a Chuba Akpom's assist sealing a 3–0 away win against Panetolikos. On 15 February 2020, he opened the score lashing the ball high into the right corner after Akpom found him with a headed pass, in a 2–1 away win against AEL.

1. FC Köln
On 7 September 2020, 1. FC Köln have reached an agreement with PAOK to sign a four years' contract with the 22-year-old international winger for €3.3 million, according to Kicker. The Greek Super League side have secured a 15% sell-on clause of any future transfer fee that 1. FC Köln will receive. The Bundesliga club made a move for the attacker after Florian Kainz underwent surgery on his knee. 14 days later he became officially a new Köln player.

In August 2021, he signed a season-long loan contract with Dutch club FC Twente. On 23 September 2021, Dimitris Limnios scored his first goal with a club in a 3-1 home win game against AZ Alkmaar, with a left footed shot from outside the box to the bottom right corner, after an assist by Virgil Misidjan following a corner.

On 25 February 2023, Dimitris Limnios returned to action with U21 FC Köln, eight and a half months after a cruciate ligament injury, also providing an assist. Limnios was coming off a successful season (eight goals and two assists in 33 appearances) on at FC Twente.

International career
Limnios has represented his country at various age groups. He was capped for Greece at Under-19 level. It was while on international duty, scoring a hat-trick against Moldova U19, that he was spotted by U.C. Sampdoria. He visited the Serie A club for a week's training in 2014.

He was a member of Greece U17 national team in the 2015 UEFA European Under-17 Championship. In the competition, he played nine games and scored two goals including qualification round. Since March 2016, he has been member of Greece national under-19 football team and played in 2017 UEFA European Under-19 Championship qualification. On 16 March 2018, he called up to the Greece national team by Michael Skibbe for the friendly match against Switzerland on 23 March 2018.

On 15 November 2019, Limnios scored the only goal of the game after 35 minutes of the UEFA Euro 2020 qualifier against Armenia. On 9 June 2022, Limnios at the last minute of a 2022–23 UEFA Nations League game against Cyprus suffered a cruciate ligament rupture, and according to doctors' estimations will be out for at least six to seven months.

Personal life
Limnios' father, Stelios, played for Niki Volos. His mother is named Aide-Silva Barreto and is from Bahia, Brazil.

In September 2020 he tested positive for COVID-19. He recovered in October of the same year.

Career statistics

Club

International goals
Scores and results list Greece's goal tally first, score column indicates score after each Limnios goal.

Honours
PAOK
Super League Greece: 2018–19
Greek Cup: 2017–18, 2018–19

References

External links

1998 births
Living people
Greek footballers
Greek people of Brazilian descent
Brazilian people of Greek descent
Association football forwards
Greece international footballers
Greece youth international footballers
Greece under-21 international footballers
Super League Greece players
Bundesliga players
Eredivisie players
Atromitos F.C. players
PAOK FC players
1. FC Köln players
FC Twente players
Greek expatriate footballers
Greek expatriate sportspeople in Germany
Expatriate footballers in Germany
Greek expatriate sportspeople in the Netherlands
Expatriate footballers in the Netherlands
Footballers from Volos